Diiodoacetylene is the organoiodine compound with the formula C2I2.  It is a white, volatile solid that dissolves in organic solvents.  It is prepared by iodination of trimethylsilylacetylene.  Although samples explode above 80 °C, diiodoacetylene is the most readily handled of the dihaloacetylenes. Dichloroacetylene, for example, is more volatile and more explosive.  As confirmed by X-ray crystallography, diiodoacetylene is linear.  It is however a shock, heat and friction sensitive compound. Like other haloalkynes, diiodoacetylene is a strong halogen bond donor.

References

Inorganic carbon compounds
Organoiodides
Dihaloacetylenes